Dryden Historic District can refer to:
 Dryden Historic District (Dryden, New York), listed on the U.S. NRHP
 Dryden Historic District (North Park, San Diego, California), proposed